St. Anne's College, Kurunegala, is a Roman Catholic boys' school located in Kurunegala, Sri Lanka. Established by Francis Saviour in 1867. Students of St. Anne's College are known as Annites.

School

Location 
Situated in central area of Kurunegala, It occupies  along St. Anne's street, boarded by Holy Family Convent to the east, St. Anne's Cathedral to the west and Maliyadeva College to the north.

Administration 
The college is funded by Ministry of Education. The principal is the head of the school and is appointed by De La Salle Brothers. The principal is assisted by two vice principals and an assistant principal. The school is divided into primary school and upper school and primary school is coming under a deputy principal. The college educates close to 3,000 students in both secondary and primary education. Administration of the college hostel is carried out by the Warden under the supervision of the Principal.

Since its establishment the main medium of education had been English; however, with Sinhala becoming the official language, the medium of education was changed to Sinhala. Since 2002 English has been reintroduced as a medium of education at the college. Students may select one of the two mediums after grade 5 in which to conduct their studies.

Admission 
Admission to the school is very competitive. Students who qualify requirements can enter grade 1. Also, students can enter through grade 5 government scholarship exam and GCE Ordinary Level in Sri Lanka.

Grounds 
The school is located in an area of 12 acres (49,000 m2) where the primary school and the upper school are located. It is equipped with facilities such as science and computer laboratories, classrooms etc. This includes the 'La Salle Auditorium' which is one of the biggest auditoria in the area.

Sport plays a major part in the school's activities. The school's facilities include a swimming pool and a modern cricket ground, basketball courts within the school premises.

History

The beginning 
It was 1867 which laid the foundation to one of the most famous school in Sri Lanka as "Roman Catholic English School" in Kurunegala. It was initiated by then Parish Priest of Kurunegala church Francis Saviour. There were 28 boys and 19 girls enrolled on the first year with two teachers. The medium of the language was only English.

But with the intention of putting up a Boys only school "Roman Catholic English School" was transformed to "St Anne's Boys College" in 1881 with the guidance of then Kurunegala Parish Priest Adrian Dufo during the term of Apostolic Vicariate of Jaffna Bishop Christopher Bonjean. The number of pupils on roll in 1881 was 101 and the first headmaster was B. S. Peterson.

The arrival of the De La Salle Brothers to the city, paved the way for the awakening of both discipline and quality education.

Hugh Ferrington was the first Director of the institution. He formed the Old Boys Association in 1935 and on 9 June of the same year the old Boys Day was inaugurated and then on 1 March 1940, The President Of the Old Boys Association is Attorney at Law, Felician Perera, the son of C. L. W. Perera. The first prize-giving was held in the open air under the directorship of Casimir Ernest, a Czech Brother.

The foundation stone for the first building was laid in 1941, and the Brothers together with 360 boys and 50 boarders moved into the new uncompleted building in 1942. Brother Theodoret of Mary succeeded Brother Casimir on 20 August 1943. He set up a laboratory and started Science studies.

Golden era 
Alban Patrick assumed the directorship in 1946 when the golden era of St. Anne's begins. St. Anne's becomes a Grade 1 School, the only one in the North Western Province in 1947, the results of public examination continue to be the best in the province, the student population rises to 1340 by 1955, the science block is declared open in 1949, which was donated by C. L. W. Perera an eminent criminal lawyer of the country who was also a benefactor of the school and who was honoured by the pope by a knighthood for the services rendered to the Catholic Church. In the same year, the Main block is completed, a Cadet Corps is started in 1952, 1953 marks the rise of the two-storied primary block. By 1954 most of the buildings are completed and the school is in a solid footing.

Free education 
The implementation of the Free Education Scheme in 1951 opened the door to the Secondary Education for the poorest boys. From 1950 to 1960 Annites did well at the University Entrance and students entered yearly to the various faculties of university.

Acquisition by the government 
The School take over was in 1960. At first, the school opted to remain private. But after struggling to maintain the status for a few years the school was handed over to the Government in 1964 during the term of the Director, Edwin Ambrose. Thus the college obtained the status of a Non-Fee Levying School. Since then the succeeding Brother Principals attempted to keep up the rising standard of St. Anne's College in spite of the changing educational environment.

School Traditions 

The college motto is "Possumus", meaning "We Can" in Latin.  Although the school is having affiliations with the Catholic Church, it is a secular school with students of all faiths admitted.

Old College Anthem 

Green, Gold and Blue were the very first College Anthem sung by the students of St. Anne's College. Bro. Hugh Faringdon introduced this anthem on 21 May 1936. Bro. Director who was well versed in literature and music wrote the lyrics and composed the music of this anthem.

Houses 
The House system was inaugurated on 10 June 1936 by Hugh Faringdon. St.John and St. De La Salle were the first two houses. House competition included games, conduct and studies. HouseMaster, Captains, Prefects and Games Captains were elected annually.

The students are divided into four Houses:

  –  De La Salle House
John Baptist De La Salle  was born on 30 April 1661 in Rheims, France. He founded the congregation of the Brothers of the Christian Schools (De La Salle Brothers) in 1680. He died on 7 April 1719. He was canonised on 24 May 1900 by Pope Leo XIII. On 15/05/1950 Pope Pius XII proclaimed him "Patron of all Teachers of Youth". His feast is held on 15 May.

  –  Benildus House
Benildus House was introduced by Alban Patrick in 1948 discontinuing John House. Bénilde Romançon, was born on 14 June 1805 in Thuret, Puy-de-Dôme, France. He did nothing extraordinary but carried out his daily tasks in the primary schools to perfection. He died on 13 August 1862. He was canonised on 29 October 1967 by Pope Paul VI. His feast is held on 13 August.

  –  Solomon House
Solomon House was introduced as the third House by Kasimir Arnost on 14/06/1938. Salomon Leclerc,F.S.C. was born on 14 November 1745 in Boulogne, France. He was Secretary-General of the De La Salle Brothers. He was martyred on 2 September 1792. He was beatified on 17 October 1926 by Pope Pius XI. His feast is held on 2 September.

  –  Miguel House
Miguel House was introduced as the fourth House in 1985 by Augustine Brendon. Miguel Febres Cordero was born on 7 November 1854 in Cuenca Ecuador. He was a man of uncommon intelligence and incredible capacity to work. He died on 9 February 1910. He was canonised on 21 August 1984. His feast is held on 9 February.

Sports

Cricket 

Battle of the Rocks (Deva – Ana Big Match), the annual Cricket encounter is a prominent sporting event played between two schools in North Western province of Sri Lanka.

The cricket match is played between St. Annes College & Maliyadeva College annually at the Welagedara Stadium, Kurunegala. The match is played over two days and the winner is presented with the Trophy. The two day match is followed by a one-day match between the two sides which started in 1992.

The encounter has a long history. However, in certain years, it was not played due to various reasons. The Year 2013 marked the 30th 2-day encounter and 18th limited-overs version of Battle of the Rocks.

Principals 
Rev. Bro. Hugh Faringdon is the first principal and present principal is Rev. Fr. Chandana Hapuarachchi. Tradition is a De La Salle brother to become the principal.

St. Anne's and other schools 
St. Anne's College's maintains an old rivalry with Maliyadeva College, Kurunegala and St. Anne's has a long familial relationship with Holy Family Convent, Kurunegala.

Notable alumni 
This is a list of notable alumni from St. Anne's College, Kurunegala.

References

External links 
 
Brothers of the Christian Schools. District of Colombo
Schools of Kurunegala Catholic Diocese

1867 establishments in Ceylon
Boys' schools in Sri Lanka
Educational institutions established in 1867
Catholic schools in Sri Lanka
Schools in Kurunegala
Schools in Sri Lanka